Lofts at 2020 (formerly known as the Sporting News Lofts building and before that as the Emerson Electric Company Building) is a national historical building which has had the address of 2012-18 Washington Avenue, St. Louis, Missouri.  The building was designed by architect Albert B. Groves and was constructed in 1920 as an eight-story concrete factory.  After World War II, the building was the headquarters for The Sporting News.  As of 2019, The Sporting News sign is still attached to the building.

The building was originally a 150,000 factory for manufacturing small motors and fans for Emerson Electric.  During World War II, Emerson produced turrets for heavy bombers such as the B-17 Flying Fortress and the B-24 Liberator.

References

National Register of Historic Places in St. Louis